Kanjany is a small village in the Thrissur district of the Indian state Kerala. It is the headquarters of Manalur Panchayat. Anthikad, Manaloor, Kandassankadavu, Arimboor are the neighbouring villages of Kanjany. It is a junction and a major centre in the Thrissur-Vadanapally state highway 75. There are business complexes, bus stand, cinemas, schools, a post office, and a church.

References

Villages in Thrissur district